Gold of the Americas: The Conquest of the New World is a 1989 video game published by Strategic Studies Group.

Gameplay
Gold of the Americas is a game in which a strategy game involves imperial expansion in the New World.

Reception
Chuck Moss reviewed the game for Computer Gaming World, and stated that "Gold of the Americas is a challenging and entertaining game with a bit of history and good deal of replay value thrown in."

Dave Morris reviewed Gold of the Americas for Games International magazine, and gave it a rating of 8 out of 10, and stated that "it's a good product – even though you may discover, as I did more than once, that final victory is much more likely to go to the (computer-run) breakaway Independent nations of the New World than to the colonial powers of the Old."

Reviews
The Games Machine - Mar, 1990
Computer Gaming World - Oct, 1990
Amiga Computing - Apr, 1990
ASM (Aktueller Software Markt) - Jan, 1990
ASM (Aktueller Software Markt) - Feb, 1990

References

External links
Review in Page 6

1989 video games
4X games
Age of Discovery video games
Amiga games
Apple IIGS games
Atari ST games
DOS games
Turn-based strategy video games
Video games developed in Australia
Video games set in North America
Video games set in South America